Matěj Lasák (born 1 May 1992) is a Czech male  cyclo-cross cyclist. He represented his nation in the men's elite event at the 2016 UCI Cyclo-cross World Championships in Heusden-Zolder.

References

External links
Profile at cyclingarchives.com

1992 births
Living people
Cyclo-cross cyclists
Czech male cyclists
Cyclists at the 2010 Summer Youth Olympics
Sportspeople from Prague